Robert L. Mallett (born April 1, 1957) is an American attorney who served as the United States Deputy Secretary of Commerce from 1997 to 2001.

References

External links

1957 births
Living people
Texas Democrats
United States Deputy Secretaries of Commerce
Morehouse College alumni
Harvard Law School alumni